Danao, officially the Municipality of Danao,  is a 4th class municipality in the province of Bohol, Philippines. According to the 2020 census, it has a population of 20,245 people.

The town of Danao, Bohol celebrates its fiesta on December 10, to honor the town patron the Holy Family.

Etymology
According to the Diccionario Español-Bisaya (1866), danao means charca, lago, laguna, pantano, estanque grande, avenida, campañas, etc. (lake, lagoon, freshet, large reservoir, arable land, field, etc.). Except that of a lake, all definitions of danao describe the municipality of Danao, with freshet being the most likely meaning. A freshet is either a sudden rise or overflow of a stream or river, or freshwater stream emptying into the sea.

History
In the beginning, Danao is part of Inabanga, when the latter became a town in 1724. In 1744, Francisco Dagohoy (Sendrijas) established the First Bohol Republic at Caylagan Cave (now Francisco Dagohoy Cave) in barangay Magtangtang, located northwest of the present-day Poblacion. Magtangtang became the seat of government and headquarters of the independent Bohol that lasted for more than 85 years.

In 1830, Talibon became an independent pueblo from Inabanga, and Danao was annexed to it. During the first US sponsored Census, Danao is listed as one of the barrios of Talibon with a recorded population of 585 in 1903.

In 1953, the town of Victoria (now Dagohoy, Bohol) was established and 5 barangays namely Cantubod, Danao, Hibale, Santa Fe, and Santo Niño were carved out from Talibon through Executive Order No. 634 by President Elpidio Quirino to form a new municipality together with other 13 barangays in Carmen, Sierra Bullones, Trinidad, and Ubay. However, after only less than 3 years of existence, Victoria was reorganized and became the new municipality of Dagohoy. The 5 barangays were reverted to Talibon through Executive Order No. 184 by President Ramon Magsaysay and upon the recommendation of the Provincial Board of Bohol.

Finally, on March 14, 1961, Danao became an independent municipality through Executive Order No. 422 by President Carlos P. Garcia. Sixteen (16) barangays from municipalities of Talibon, Inabanga, and Carmen with the seat of government at barangay Danao were organized into a new town. The list of barangays are shown below:

Geography
The Isumod river flowing near the town center of Danao may suddenly overflow and inundate a large portion of the town. The river joins the Wahig river and empties into the sea.

Barangays
Danao comprises 17 barangays:

Climate

Demographics

Economy

Tourism
 Bohol Sea of Clouds: A picturesque ocean-like view of clouds on top of Laguna Hills at barangay Concepcion which about 5 kilometers from the town proper. This majestic occurrence is much observable from 4 to 6 o'clock in the morning which happens throughout the year whenever the weather is fine. It requires visitors to have a 10-minute walk to reach the top the hill.
 Dagohoy Historical Marker: A historical marker on Dagohoy's grave in the mountains installed in his honor. The Dagohoy Marker located in barangay Magtangtang, was installed by the Philippine Historical Commission to honor the heroic deeds of Dagohoy. Magtangtang was Francisco Dagohoy's headquarters or hideout during the revolt. Hundreds of Dagohoy's followers preferred death inside the cave than surrender. Their skeletons still remain in the site.
 Eco, Extreme, and Educational Adventure Tour (EAT) Danao offers a great new experience of Bohol. One can soar across one of Bohol's most attractive gorges like a bird; raft or canoe on a river; explore caves; practice mountain climbing, both on a wall, and on real cliffs; and explore some of the wildest spots of the island. This 144-hectare property is located in Magtangtang which is about 10 kilometers from the town proper, and managed by the local government unit.
Francisco Dagohoy Cave: Formerly known as Caylagan cave, the site served as the headquarter of the independent Bohol Republic established by the great Boholano hero, Francisco Dagohoy in 1744. Dagohoy rebellion is the longest revolt in the Philippines which lasted 85 years from 1744 to 1829. The cave is said to be the passageway to other few more caves in the province. However, such passageways were merely inaccessible due to previous earthquakes that badly hit the area.
Kamira Cave: Similar to Caylagan cave, the site is located in barangay Magtangtang. It is a 477-meter long cave and will take 45 minutes to explore. Characterized by the presence of narrow passages; stalactites and stalagmites; bats, and freshwater crabs, the place is a marvel and allow visitors to experience wonders of nature. The icy cold water that flows through the cave also provides a chilly feeling.

Education

Galleries

References

Sources

External links

 [ Philippine Standard Geographic Code]
Municipality of Danao

Municipalities of Bohol
Establishments by Philippine executive order